Castries is the capital and largest city in Saint Lucia.

Castries or de Castries may also refer to

 Castries, Hérault, a commune in France
 Château de Castries, a Hérault castle of the House of Castries
 Castries District, a Saint Lucia district containing Castries town 
 Hôtel de Castries, a Paris mansion of the House of Castries
 House of Castries, a French noble family
 Province of Castries, a Roman Catholic province covering the archdiocese and its suffragan dioceses in nearby anglophone islands
 Castries River, a river in Castries District, Saint Lucia
 Roman Catholic Archdiocese of Castries, covering all of Saint Lucia

See also
 De-Kastri, a rural locality in Khabarovsk Krai, Russia
 Duc de Castries (disambiguation)